Alpha Gamma Omega (or AGO) was founded in 1927 at UCLA as a Christ-centered fraternity. Alpha Gamma Omega now has chapters at universities in California, Colorado, North Carolina, Pennsylvania, and Virginia. It maintains a close relationship with its Christian sorority counterpart, Alpha Delta Chi, considered the fraternity's "sister sorority."

Constitution 
The preamble to the fraternity's constitution is as follows:

Fraternity letters 
Alpha and Omega represent the sovereign majesty of God and His dominion and lordship over all things. These letters come from the book of Revelation, where Jesus Christ says, "I am the Alpha and the Omega, the first and the last, the beginning and the end." The letter Gamma, the third letter in the Greek alphabet, represents Christ, which itself begins with "C", the third letter of the English alphabet. It is in the center to represent Christ being at the center of the fraternity and the lives of its members.

National fraternity events 

 Founders' Day – Scheduled annually on the last Saturday of February, the active and alumni members come together to celebrate the founding of the fraternity.
 All-AGO Pismo Beach Flag Football Tournament – Every October, the Kappa chapter hosts all chapters as they compete on the Pismo-Oceano Dunes against one another in a 7 on 7 flag football tournament.
 Annual alumni camping trip to Yosemite – Every summer, the fraternity hosts a camping trip open to all alumni members.

Membership requirements 
Pledges may become active members of an AGO chapter at the invitation of the current active members. To become eligible for activation, pledges must complete a pledge program, unique to each chapter but governed by the National Executive Committee.

During the pledge semester, pledges take part in activities designed to promote Christ-centered brotherhood with each other and with the active and alumni members. They have opportunities to plan and participate in bible studies, meetings, and social events. During this time, pledges are required to learn the traditions of the fraternity and the university, and are required to maintain a high scholastic average.

Chapters 

Since its founding in 1927, Alpha Gamma Omega has chartered new chapters all over the United States.
 Alpha – UCLA (founded 1927)
 Beta – UC Berkeley (founded 1938)
 Gamma – California State University, Long Beach (founded 1962)
 Delta – California State University, Los Angeles (inactive; founded 1964)
 Epsilon – San Diego State University (founded 1965)
 Zeta – University of California, Santa Barbara (founded 1987)
 Eta – California State University, Fresno (founded 1987)
 Theta – Arizona State University (inactive; founded 1989)
 Iota – UC Davis (inactive; founded 1992)
 Kappa – Cal Poly San Luis Obispo (founded 1992)
 Lambda – UC Irvine (inactive; founded 1993)
 Mu – Illinois State University (inactive; founded 1994)
 Nu – Baylor University (inactive; founded 1996)
 Xi – University of Colorado at Boulder (founded 1997)
 Omicron – University of North Carolina at Charlotte (founded 1999; rechartered 2017)
 Pi – University of Southern California (founded 2001)
 Rho – Colorado State University (inactive; founded 2011)
 Sigma – University of California, Riverside (inactive; founded 2012)
 Tau – Santa Clara University (founded 2013)
 Upsilon – Appalachian State University (founded 2017)
 Phi – University of Denver (founded 2017)
 Chi – Lynchburg, VA (founded 2018)
 Psi – West Chester University (founded 2018)
 Omega – The University of Virginia's College at Wise (founded 2019)

Notable alumni
 Burton L. Goddard, First general secretary and an editor/translator of the Committee on Bible Translation, which in 1978 produced, with the help of other scholars and stylists, the New International Version of the Bible. Dean and Professor at Gordon Conwell Seminary. UCLA Chapter
 Percy Crawford, founder of The King's College, UCLA Chapter
 Harold Lindsell, author, scholar, founding faculty member of Fuller Theological Seminary, editor of Christianity Today. UC Berkeley Chapter
 Benjamin Weir, Moderator of the General Assembly of the Presbyterian Church (USA), UC Berkeley Chapter
 Beau Wirick, actor, USC Chapter

See also
List of social fraternities and sororities

References

External links
 

Baylor University
University of California, Los Angeles
Christian fraternities and sororities in the United States
1927 establishments in California
Student organizations established in 1927
Christian organizations established in 1927